The black-bibbed cicadabird or black-bibbed cuckooshrike (Edolisoma mindanense) is a species of bird in the family Campephagidae. It is endemic to the Philippines. The species is elusive and poorly known.

The black-bibbed cicadabird is thought to be restricted to  tropical moist lowland forest. It is threatened by habitat loss.

Description 
EBird describes the bird as "A medium-sized bird of lowland and foothill forest. Gray on the crown and back, with black feathers in the edge of the wing and a black tail with white corners. Male has a black forehead, face, and chest, and female has gray underparts. Races differ, with southern birds having paler bellies. Female is similar to female Blackish cuckooshrike, but Black-bibbed has a stouter bill and a paler belly. Voice includes a sharp “wek!” and a downslurred whistle repeated at short intervals." It is often seen either alone or in mixed-species flocks,

They are sexually dimorphic in which males have the eponymous black bib and overall darker plumage with the females lighter and having "bibs" of either gray or white depending on the subspecies -

Subspecies 
Five subspecies are recognized:

 Edolisoma mindanense mindanense: Found on Mindanao and Basilan
 Edolisoma mindanense lecroyae :  Found on Luzon
 Edolisoma mindanense ripleyi: Found on Samar, Leyte, Bohol and Biliran
 Edolisoma mindanense elusum: Found on Mindoro
 Edolisoma mindanense everetti : Found on Jolo, Tawi-Tawi, and the island in the Sulu Archipelago

Habitat and Conservation Status 
Its natural habitats at tropical moist lowland primary forest and secondary forest up to 1,000 meters above sea level.

The IUCN Red List has assessed this bird as vulnerable with the population being estimated at 2,500 to 9,999 mature individuals. Extensive lowland deforestation on all islands in its range is the main threat. Most remaining lowland forest that is not afforded protection leaving it vulnerable to both legal and Illegal logging, conversion into farmlands through Slash-and-burn and mining. Its preference for low altitudes suggests that it must have suffered population losses with the loss of lowland forest in the Philippines.

Conservation actions proposed are further surveys to better understand distribution and population status in remaining habitat. It is also recommended that protection in existing protected areas be improved and other key habitats be formally protectef.

References

black-bibbed cicadabird
Taxa named by Arthur Hay, 9th Marquess of Tweeddale
black-bibbed cicadabird
Endemic birds of the Philippines
Taxonomy articles created by Polbot